Kahina Bahloul (born 5 March 1979) is a French imam and Islamic academic. She is an advocate for modernist reforms in Islam and is the first female imam in France.

Biography 
Kahina Bahloul was born in France to a French mother and an Algerian father. Her family was interfaith, with her father being Muslim and her mother coming from a Christian and Jewish family. She was raised in the Kabylia region of Algeria. Her father taught her to practice Islam in conjunction with humanism and progressivism. She returned to France in 2003.

Bahloul was educated as a lawyer, and she worked in insurance for 12 years. She stopped attending mosques in 2014 due to sex segregation that she said resulted in lower quality facilities for Muslim women.

The November 2015 Paris attacks convinced Bahloul that she should become involved in Islamic reform. In response to the attacks, she founded the discussion group . The attacks also made her decide to become an imam, and she attended the École pratique des hautes études to obtain a doctorate in Islamic studies.

Bahloul co-founded Fatma Mosque in 2018 as a unisex place of worship that allows men and women to pray and lead prayers together. Fatma Mosque operated online during the COVID-19 pandemic.

Political and religious views 
Bahloul supports the liberalization of Islam and the acceptance of women in Islamic practices. She is critical of mainstream Islamic scholarship, alleging that it "emanates from medieval thought". She argues that conservative sects of Islam view the religion from a male perspective, promoting patriarchy and misogyny. Bahloul advocates individual reading and interpretation of the Quran. She does not wear a veil and does not believe that it is required by the Quran.

Bahloul supports the development of a French Islamic religious identity distinct from that of Muslim-majority nations. She is critical of the French Council of the Muslim Faith, arguing that it represents the Islamic governments of other nations rather than French Muslims.

See also 

 Women in Islam

References

External links 

 "Meet Kahina Bahloul, France's first female imam" – Interview by euronews on YouTube, English subtitles (9:37)

Living people
1979 births
French imams
French people of Jewish descent
20th-century French women
21st-century French women
French women academics
French Sufis
École pratique des hautes études alumni
Muslim reformers
Proponents of Islamic feminism
French Muslim activists
Female Islamic religious leaders